Heiko Peschke (born 18 September 1963) is a German former professional footballer who played as a defender.

He appeared in 288 top-flight matches in Germany - 221 in the Oberliga and 67 in the Bundesliga. He won five caps for East Germany in 1990.

External links

References

1963 births
Living people
German footballers
East German footballers
Association football defenders
East Germany international footballers
Hallescher FC players
FC Carl Zeiss Jena players
KFC Uerdingen 05 players
Bundesliga players
2. Bundesliga players
DDR-Oberliga players